Mary Frances Crosby (born September 14, 1959) is an American actress. She played Kristin Shepard in the television series Dallas (1979–1981, 1991).

Personal life
Mary Frances Crosby was born on September 14, 1959, in Los Angeles, California, the only daughter of singer and actor Bing Crosby from his second marriage to actress Kathryn Grant. She graduated from high school at 15, after which she entered the University of Texas at Austin, where she was a member of Delta Delta Delta sorority, though she never graduated. She is fluent in Spanish. She was married to Eb Lottimer from 1978 to 1989 and, since 1998, has been married to Mark Brodka, with whom she has two children.

Career

Crosby played Kristin Shepard (Sue Ellen Ewing's scheming sister) on the prime time soap opera Dallas from 1979–81, and a further guest appearance in 1991. Her character is perhaps best remembered for her part in the cliffhanger ending of the 1979–1980 season of Dallas, titled "A House Divided", which was resolved in the fourth episode of the following season, "Who Done It". In that highly watched episode, J.R. Ewing (Larry Hagman) was shot by an unknown assailant. Viewers had to wait all summer (and most of the fall due to a Hollywood actors' strike) to learn whether J.R. would survive, and which of his many enemies was responsible. In the summer of 1980, the advertising catchphrase, "Who shot J.R.?", was widely publicized.

Ultimately, Kristin Shepard was revealed to have been the person who pulled the trigger in the classic episode, which aired on November 21, 1980. It was one of the highest-rated episodes of a TV show ever aired. Her character, Kristin Shepard, later made an appearance in the Dallas spin-off series Knots Landing in 1980, before a brief return to Dallas in 1981. Once again the focus of a highly rated cliffhanger, it was revealed in the season opening episode (October 9, 1981) that it was Kristin's body floating in the Southfork Ranch swimming pool. She returned for the final episode of Dallas in 1991, playing the same character in a vision experienced by J.R.

After Dallas, Crosby starred in ABC miniseries Hollywood Wives (1985) and North and South, Book II (1986). She guest-starred in Hotel, The Love Boat, Murder, She Wrote, Lois & Clark: The New Adventures of Superman, Star Trek: Deep Space Nine, CHiPs,Dream On, Beverly Hills, 90210, and In the Heat of the Night.

In 1981, she played the leading role of a woman stalked in the remake of the Doris Day thriller Midnight Lace. Other film credits include Last Plane Out (1983), The Ice Pirates (1984), Tapeheads (1988), and The Legend of Zorro'' (2005).

Filmography

Television

Film

References

External links

1959 births
Actresses from Los Angeles
American child actresses
American film actresses
American television actresses
American soap opera actresses
Living people
Bing Crosby